JMH may refer to:

Hospitals
 Jackson Memorial Hospital, associated with the University of Miami school of medicine

Publications
 Journal of Mental Health, published bimonthly in the United Kingdom
 The Journal of Military History, published quarterly by the Society for Military History
 Journal of Mississippi History, published quarterly by the Mississippi Historical Society
 Journal of Modern History, published by the University of Chicago Press
 Journal of Mormon History, published quarterly by the Mormon History Association

Schools
 James Madison High School (disambiguation)
 James Meehan High School, in New South Wales, Australia
 John Maland High School, in Devon, Alberta, Canada
 John Marshall High School (disambiguation)
 Jordan-Matthews High School, in Siler City, North Carolina

Science
 John-Milton-Hagen blood group antigen, protein fixed to cell membrane by GPI linkage